Daniels v. United States, 531 U.S. 374 (2001), was a decision by the Supreme Court of the United States involving the Armed Career Criminal Act.  The Court ruled, in a 5–4 decision, that a defendant sentenced under that Act could not challenge previous convictions on appeal that were used to increase his new sentence.

Background and lower court proceedings
In 1994, Earthy D. Daniels, Jr., was convicted of being a felon in possession of a firearm. Under the Armed Career Criminal Act of 1984, which imposes a mandatory minimum 15-year sentence on anyone convicted of being a felon in possession of a firearm and who has three previous convictions for a violent felony, Daniels' sentence was enhanced. After an unsuccessful appeal, Daniels filed a motion to vacate, set aside, or correct his federal sentence. Daniels argued that his sentence violated the Constitution because it was based in part on two prior convictions that were themselves unconstitutional. The District Court denied the motion. The Ninth Circuit Court of Appeals affirmed the decision, reasoning that they could only review those prior convictions if a Gideon violation was alleged. Daniels sought review in the Supreme Court, which agreed to hear the case.

The Court's decision
In an opinion delivered by Justice Sandra Day O'Connor, the Supreme Court affirmed the lower courts' dismissal of Daniels' claim.  The Court stated that the nonexistent or unsuccessful pursuit of available challenges to the constitutionality of prior state convictions, which were used to enhance a federal sentence, precluded such challenge to collaterally attack a federal sentence. "[Daniels] could have pursued his claims while he was in custody on those convictions," wrote Justice O'Connor for the majority. "As his counsel conceded at oral argument, there is no indication that [Daniels] did so or that he was prevented from doing so by some external force." Three other Justices agreed with the decision in full while Justice Antonin Scalia agreed with the understanding that Daniels, under different circumstances, could receive special review of prior convictions.

Dissent
Justice David H. Souter wrote a dissenting opinion, disagreeing with the majority's usage of the text of the Act in question.  Justice Stephen Breyer also filed a dissent, writing that the silence of a Congressional statute to discuss the implications of an enhanced sentence would allow for challenges to that enhanced sentence.

See also
 Criminal law
 Sixth Amendment to the United States Constitution
 Lackawanna County District Attorney v. Coss (2001)

References

External links

United States Supreme Court cases
2001 in United States case law
United States Supreme Court criminal cases
United States Free Speech Clause case law
United States Supreme Court cases of the Rehnquist Court
Armed Career Criminal Act case law